Epiperipatus barbouri is a species of velvet worm in the Peripatidae family. This species is a dark purple, almost black, without any pattern on its dorsal surface. The ventral surface is much lighter and purplish pink. Females of this species have 30 to 34 pairs of legs. The type locality is in Grenada.

References

Onychophorans of tropical America
Onychophoran species
Animals described in 1911